Kathleen Madigan is an American comedian and TV personality. In addition to her stand-up comedy performances, she is a regular guest on a variety of U.S. television programs.

Early life and education
Madigan was born in Florissant, Missouri, one of seven children in an Irish Catholic family. Her parents, Jack and Vicki Madigan, are a lawyer and a nurse respectively. She grew up mostly in Florissant, a suburb of St. Louis, although the family also lived for periods of time in House Springs, Missouri and in the Lake of the Ozarks region of central Missouri. Madigan received the first eight years of her education largely in private Catholic schools, although she also attended the public School of the Osage. It was there she excelled as a student athlete, participating in volleyball, track, and basketball. In the latter, she set a record by winning the 1978 Mid-Missouri Hoops Shoot Championship. At the time she was 4' 5" tall and set a record as the shortest person to win the event. She shot under-handed, sinking 14 of 15 attempts.

Madigan attended McCluer North High School graduating in 1983. She admitted in a 2012 interview with St. Louis Magazine, however, that she participated in few activities like float decorating or prom, choosing instead to work at a steakhouse where she could make up to $200 per night. Madigan attended University of Missouri–St. Louis for two years, but, according to Madigan, all she did was accumulate $7,000 in campus parking tickets.  At Southern Illinois University Edwardsville, she earned a B.A. in Journalism in 1988. While at SIUE she was in charge of the student newspaper and also served an internship with the St. Louis Blues professional ice hockey team.

Professional career
Madigan first took a job in print journalism, working for the St. Louis-area Suburban Journals newspapers as well as the publications department of the Missouri Athletic Club. At the same time, she performed stand-up during "open mic" nights at St. Louis area comedy clubs. She credits her father, Jack, with encouraging her to try a comedy career. Her growing popularity at these soon led to the offer of a paying job in stand-up from The Funny Bone, a nationwide chain of comedy clubs. With a thirty-week booking of guaranteed dates, Madigan gave up her jobs in Missouri. She cites Ron White, Richard Jeni and Lewis Black among her influences in those early comedy club days.

Among the TV shows and specials Madigan has appeared on are Last Comic Standing, I Love the 90s: Part Deux, I Love the '80s 3-D, and Celebrity Poker Showdown. She also starred in her own HBO Half-Hour Comedy Special and a Comedy Central Presents special. She is a veteran of The Tonight Show with Jay Leno, Late Night with Conan O'Brien, Late Show with David Letterman, and The Bob and Tom Show. She also hosts a radio program, Blue Collar Comedy, on Sirius XM Radio.
Madigan has twice participated in USO shows in support of American troops, touring both Iraq and Afghanistan along with fellow comedians like friend Lewis Black. She sometimes writes material for other comedians, as was the case in 2004 and 2005 when she was a writer for Garry Shandling when he hosted the Emmy Awards telecast. In 2016, she made an appearance on Jerry Seinfeld's web series Comedians in Cars Getting Coffee.

In the wake of her touring stoppage due to the COVID-19 pandemic Madigan launched her own comedy podcast in August 2020, Madigan's Pubcast. On Saturday, December 19, 2020, she appeared on Byron Allen's Comics Unleashed episode of "Girls Gone Wild" on CBS.

Honors
In 1996, Madigan won "Funniest Female Stand-Up Comic" at the American Comedy Awards.

Personal life
Madigan is single and lives in The Ozarks. She also owns a farm in the Midwest and, according to her, "spends inordinate amounts of time" with her family there. Madigan has four brothers and two sisters. She has often drawn on her father as both a source of comic material and work ethic.  In the past, she dated Lewis Black. Their split was amicable, and she still considers Black her best friend.

Media

CDs
 Kathleen Madigan (1998), later reissued as Live (2000)
 Shallow Happy Thoughts for the Soul (2002)
 In Other Words (2006)
 Gone Madigan (2011)
 Madigan Again (2013)
 Bothering Jesus (2016)

DVDs
In Other Words (2005)
 Gone Madigan (2011)
 Madigan Again (2013)
 Bothering Jesus (2016)

Television appearances
Lewis Black's Root of All Evil - (Performer, Consulting Producer, and Writer)
One Night Stand HBO
Truly Funny Women" Lifetime
Kathleen Madigan: Bothering Jesus, Netflix
Comics Unleashed with Byron Allen,  CBS, December 19, 2020
Kathleen Madigan: Hunting Bigfoot, Amazon Prime Video

References

External links

Interview with Kathleen Madigan – Montgomery Advertiser, February, 2016.

21st-century American comedians
American people of Irish descent
American women comedians
American podcasters
American women podcasters
Comedians from Missouri
Last Comic Standing contestants
Southern Illinois University Edwardsville alumni
University of Missouri–St. Louis alumni
Living people
People from Florissant, Missouri
21st-century American women
Year of birth missing (living people)